Caryota mitis, known as the clustering fishtail palm or fishtail palm, is a species of palm native to Tropical Asia from India to Java to southern China, now sparingly naturalized in southern Florida and in parts of Africa and Latin America. The species was originally described from Vietnam in 1790. In Florida, it grows in hummocks and in disturbed wooded areas.

Caryota mitis has clustered stems up to 10 m (33 feet) tall and 15 cm (6 inches) in diameter. Leaves can be up to 3 m (10 feet) long. Flowers are purple, and the fruits—harmful to humans—are dark purple or red.

Uses
Cultivated mainly as an ornament plant in Cambodia, where it is named tunsaé töch, traditional healers burn the heaps of felted hairs from the leaves' axils to treat ill limbs of patients.

Toxicity
The fruit of C. mitis is saturated with raphides, sharp, needle-shaped crystals of calcium oxalate. The raphides are strong irritants that cause damage and subsequent itching upon contact with skin, and if ingested, the mouth. This is a result of the physical structure of the raphides, and not any chemical reaction.

Gallery

References

mitis
Flora of China
Trees of Indo-China
Trees of Malesia
Garden plants of Asia
Ornamental trees